Guadarrama is a town and municipality in the Cuenca del Guadarrama comarca, in the Community of Madrid, Spain.

Its population is 13,032 (winter, according to a 2006 census); the population swells to approximately 60,000 in summer.

Its name comes from arabic Wadi-ar-ramla river (dry riverbed).

Guadarrama achieved the status of "villa" under Fernando V of Castile (II of Aragon) on November 22, 1504. Fernando VI ordered the building of a road to A Coruña through the Guadarrama Pass, through which passed the Grande Armée with Napoleon searching For John Moore's Army in 1808.

This town was absolutely destroyed during the Spanish Civil War, as it was for almost three years a battlefront.  All one can see in this town today is new, built in the mid-20th century.

It was the location for some scenes in the 1964 film The Fall of the Roman Empire.

It is close to Sierra de Guadarrama, a mountain range that is visited by Madrid residents seeking cooler temperatures, especially in summer.

See also
 Los Negrales

References

Municipalities in the Community of Madrid